Ghiasuddin Ahmad (born 1 January 1927) was an Indian politician. He was born in Kalinagar (Nadia District). He was the son of Mohammad Samad Ali. He studied at Krishnanagar Government College and Union Christian Training College, obtaining B.A. (Hons.) and B.T. degrees. He worked as school teacher. He served as secretary of the Nadia District Congress Committee.

He won the Chapra seat in the 1972 West Bengal Legislative Assembly election, standing as the Congress (R) candidate. He obtained 27,514 votes (60.37%). He lost the Chapra seat in the 1977 West Bengal Legislative Assembly election, finishing in third place with 8,035 votes (14.63%).

References

1927 births
Possibly living people
Indian National Congress politicians
West Bengal MLAs 1972–1977